The 1967–68 Hellenic Football League season was the 15th in the history of the Hellenic Football League, a football competition in England.

Premier Division

The Premier Division featured 15 clubs which competed in the division last season, along with two new clubs, promoted from Division One:
Abingdon Town
Pinehurst

League table

Division One

The Division One featured 13 clubs which competed in the division last season, along with 3 new clubs:
Lambourn Sports, relegated from the Premier Division
Thatcham, relegated from the Premier Division
Clanfield

League table

References

External links
 Hellenic Football League

1967-68
H